Solent Sky is an aviation museum in Southampton, Hampshire, previously known as Southampton Hall of Aviation.

It depicts the history of aviation in Southampton, the Solent area and Hampshire. There is special focus on the Supermarine aircraft company, based in Southampton, and its most famous products, the Supermarine S.6 seaplane and the Supermarine Spitfire, designed by R. J. Mitchell. There is also coverage of the Schneider Trophy seaplane races, twice held at Calshot Spit, and the flying boat services which operated from the Solent. In December 2019 the Calshot Spit lightship was relocated next to the museum in order to be converted into part of the museum's cafe. In September 2020, 3 of Southampton's former trams were moved to the museum site where it is planned they will undergo restoration before going on public display.

Construction of the current building began in 1983 and was designed by Barry Eaton, then the City Architect. It opened in 1984.

Exhibits

Aircraft on display
Aircraft on display at the museum include:

 Avro 504J - Replica 
 Britten-Norman BN-1
 de Havilland Sea Vixen FAW Mk.1 - XJ476
 de Havilland Tiger Moth
 de Havilland Vampire
 Folland Gnat
 Hawker Siddeley Harrier GR.3 - Cockpit section. Modified to resemble Harrier FRS.1
 Mignet HM.14 Pou-du-Ciel
 Saro Skeeter (x 2)
 Saunders-Roe SR.A/1 - TG263
 Short Sandringham S.25/V - VH-BRC, Beachcomber
 Slingsby Grasshopper
 Slingsby Tandem Tutor
 SUMPAC
 Supermarine S.6A - N248, competed in the 1929 Schneider Trophy
 Supermarine Seagull - Nose section only
 Supermarine Spitfire F.24 - PK683
 Supermarine Swift - Cockpit section
 Wight Quadruplane - Replica

Engines on display

Alvis Leonides
Alvis Leonides Major
Bristol Siddeley Orpheus
Bristol Proteus
de Havilland Gipsy Major
Gnome Monosoupape
Metrovick Beryl
Napier Gazelle
Napier Lion
Napier Naiad
Napier Sabre
Napier Scorpion
Rolls-Royce/Continental 0-300
Rolls-Royce Derwent
Rolls-Royce Merlin

Calshot Spit lightship

The Calshot Spit Lightship (LV 78) is a lightship built in Southampton in 1914.  It was decommissioned in 1987.  Between 1988 and 2010, it was located at the entrance to Ocean Village marina, which formed a static attraction at the marina.  This Trinity House navigation aid had guided ships entering Southampton Water from the western end of the Solent, coming around the low lying sand and shingle Calshot Spit. It was built in 1914 by J I Thornycroft shipyard in Southampton, and decommissioned in 1978.  The lightship was removed on 3 November 2010 and taken to be restored at Trafalgar Dry Dock. The lightship was to become a "gateway attraction" at a new heritage museum called Aeronautica. The plans for Aeronautica came to a halt in January 2012. In December 2019 the Calshot Spit Lightship was transported to its new home at the Solent Sky Museum.

Police and Fire Heritage Collection

In 2017 an exhibition by the Hampshire Police and Fire Heritage Trust was added to the museum.

Charity
The work of Solent Sky is supported by a registered charity, the R. J. Mitchell Memorial Museum Limited, whose objects are "to advance the education of the public in matters relating to aviation by establishing and maintaining a museum as a permanent memorial to R. J. Mitchell, the designer of the Schneider Trophy S6B seaplane and the Spitfire."

See also
 List of aerospace museums

References

External links

 
 R. J. Mitchell website
 Profile at Aviation Museums of the World
 Museum guide at Aeroflight

Aerospace museums in England
Museums in Southampton
The Solent
Science and technology in Hampshire